Manenti is an Italian surname. Notable people with the surname include:

Davide Manenti (born 1989), Italian sprinter
John Manenti (born  1972), Australian rugby union player
Vincenzo Manenti ( 1600–1674), Italian Baroque painter

Italian-language surnames